Mecodema godzilla is a large-bodied ground beetle endemic to the North Island, New Zealand. It was described from two specimens, which are housed in two different entomological collections, the Auckland Museum and Lincoln University.

Diagnosis 
Can be distinguished from other North Island Mecodema species by:

 its size (34–36 mm long and 11.5–13 mm wide); 
 elytra truncated by steep apical slope; 
 lateral carina broad and reflexed upward the entire length.

Description 
Length 34.3–36.4 mm, pronotal width 10.1–11.2 mm, elytral width 11.7–12.9 mm. Colour of head and pronotum black to glossy black, elytra matte reddish-brown to matte black, ventrally (including legs) brown to matte black.

Natural history 
Found on the scree and tussock slopes of Mt Ruapehu.

References 

godzilla
Beetles described in 2019